The Clijsters–Henin rivalry was a tennis rivalry between Kim Clijsters and Justine Henin. The two Belgians met 25 times between 1998 and 2010, with eight taking place in a major tournament. Their overall head-to-head was 13–12 favoring Clijsters, but Henin led 5–3 at the majors, including winning all three of their major finals.

History of the rivalry
They first met in 1998 with Henin winning in Ramat HaSharon. 2001 was a historic year for the pair. Their first match was decided in the final set at Indian Wells in the third round which Clijsters won. At the French Open the tournament witnessed Clijsters and Henin facing off in the semifinals, where the winner would become Belgium's first ever singles Grand Slam finalist. Clijsters won the match in three sets before losing to Jennifer Capriati in the final. Just two weeks later though Henin beat Clijsters in three sets to win the Heineken Open. In November the pair teamed up to bring Belgium its first success in the Fed Cup competition.

Clijsters won in straight sets in both Sydney and the Australian Open quarterfinals at the start of 2002. Henin won only her second match in six meetings against Clijsters in the semifinals of Rome. In their final match of 2002 at the WTA Championships, Clijsters lost just three games to Henin.

At the Adidas International in the first of eight matches between the pair in 2003, Clijsters saw off Hénin-Hardenne in straight sets to reach the final against Lindsay Davenport, which Clijsters won. The pair's next meeting came in the semifinals of their home event, the Proximus Diamond Games, with Clijsters again winning in straight sets before falling to Venus Williams in the final. Hénin-Hardenne hit back to win her first match of the year against Clijsters in Berlin. As Clijsters wasted three match points as Henin won the match in the final set 7–5. Henin then squared the series up for the year as she lost just four games to Clijsters as she won the French Open. Just two weeks later Clijsters stopped the two-game losing streak as Henin retired from the final of the Ordina Open. The pair's next meeting was at the Acura Classic with Henin fighting back from a set down to defeat her compatriot. Henin went on to claim her second Grand Slam title of the year, defeating Clijsters in straight sets at the US Open. In their final match of the year the World Number One was at stake as they faced off in Germany. Clijsters was the reigning World Number One and claimed it as she defeated Henin, coming from a set down to do so.

The Belgians met just once in 2004 and 2005, at the opening Grand Slam Tournament of 2004, the Australian Open.  Again it was in the final and again Henin triumphed in the final set. It was a year and a half before they met again, this time in the final of the Rogers Cup, and Clijsters defeated Henin-Hardenne, whilst in the middle of a 22-match winning streak. The rivalry came to an end in 2006 as Clijsters retired in 2007, but not before three more matches were played. 2006 witnessed Henin defeating Clijsters in all three matches. Henin won in straight sets at the French Open and at Wimbledon, but needed three sets to get rid of her rival at Eastbourne.  Wimbledon was the last match they played and it left Henin winning the series by 12 matches to 10. Also in 2006 Clijsters and Henin guided their nation to the final of the Fed Cup where they lost. Clijsters and Henin only played in the first round together; all other rounds Kirsten Flipkens played, partnering Clijsters in the semifinals and Henin in the final.

Henin then followed suit and retired in 2008, but in 2009, Clijsters came out of retirement and Henin followed for the start of the 2010 season, reigniting the rivalry. Henin met Clijsters in the final at Brisbane in her first tournament back, which Clijsters finally won in the final set tiebreak.  They then met in Miami and shared another match which went to the final set tie-break again. Clijsters then defeated Henin in three sets at the fourth round of the 2010 Wimbledon Championships, while Henin injured her elbow during the first set, as Clijsters took the renewed rivalry score to 3–0. The pair considered putting their fierce rivalry aside to compete together in doubles at the 2012 Olympic Games; but the rivalry ended when Henin retired once again, this time on doctors' advice because of the elbow injury sustained against Clijsters at Wimbledon, after playing the 2011 Australian Open, leaving the final head-to-head 13–12 in Clijsters' favour. The pair's final match together was an exhibition in Antwerp in December 2010 with Clijsters winning a match tiebreaker.

During the height of their rivalry in 2003, Clijsters openly accused Henin in media of poor sportsmanship and taking advantage by asking for a medical treatment when Henin was behind in their tennis matches. Clijsters stated that Henin often faked her injuries to distract her opponents. In 2011, after her second retirement, Henin talked about the controversial moment during their 2004 Australian Open final, when a Clijsters' forehand swing volley on break point at 3-4 in the third set was incorrectly overruled.

Head-to-head

Clijsters–Henin (13–12)

Breakdown of the rivalry
Hard courts: Clijsters, 8–4
Clay courts: Henin, 5–1
Grass courts: Henin, 3–2
Indoor carpet: Clijsters, 2–0
Grand Slam matches: Henin, 5–3
Grand Slam finals: Henin, 3–0
Year-End Championships matches: Clijsters, 1–0
Year-End Championships finals: None
Fed Cup matches: None; they were unable to play each other in a Fed Cup match because they both represented Belgium.
All finals: Henin, 7–4

WTA rankings

Year-end ranking timeline

See also
List of tennis rivalries

References

External links
Clijsters-Henin rivalry preview 2010 Wimbledon

Tennis rivalries